Madhuca fusca is a tree in the family Sapotaceae. The specific epithet fusca means "very dark brown", referring to the indumentum.

Distribution and habitat
Madhuca fusca is endemic to Borneo. Its habitat is kerangas forests to  altitude.

Conservation
Madhuca fusca has been assessed as endangered on the IUCN Red List. The species is threatened by logging and conversion of land for palm oil plantations.

References

fusca
Endemic flora of Borneo
Trees of Borneo
Plants described in 1890